AM-251 is an inverse agonist at the CB1 cannabinoid receptor. AM-251 is structurally very close to rimonabant; both are biarylpyrazole cannabinoid receptor antagonists. In AM-251, the p-chloro group attached to the phenyl substituent at C-5 of the pyrazole ring is replaced with a p-iodo group. The resulting compound exhibits slightly better binding affinity for the CB1 receptor (with a Ki value of 7.5 nM) than rimonabant, which has a Ki value of 11.5 nM, AM-251 is, however, about two-fold more selective for the CB1 receptor when compared to rimonabant. Like rimonabant, it is additionally a μ-opioid receptor antagonist that attenuates analgesic effects.

AM251 has shown an in vitro antimelanoma activity against pancreatic and colon cancer cells.

See also 
 Discovery and development of Cannabinoid Receptor 1 Antagonists

References 

CB1 receptor antagonists
1-Piperidinyl compounds
Pyrazoles
Hydrazides
Iodoarenes
Chloroarenes
AM cannabinoids
Pyrazolecarboxamides
Mu-opioid receptor antagonists
Antineoplastic drugs